Area code 250 is a telephone area code in the North American Numbering Plan (NANP) for the Canadian province of British Columbia outside the Lower Mainland, including Vancouver Island–home to the provincial capital, Victoria–and the province's Interior region. In addition, the numbering plan area extends into the United States community of Hyder, Alaska, located along the Canada–United States border near the town of Stewart. The incumbent local exchange carriers that service the area code are Telus, Northwestel, and CityWest in the city of Prince Rupert.

History

Area code 250 was created on October 19, 1996, as a split of area code 604, which was retained by the Lower Mainland. Prior to 1996, 604 had been the sole area code in British Columbia for almost half a century. British Columbia would have likely needed another area code in any event because of the province's growth in the second half of the 20th century, but the split was hastened by Canada's system of number allocation. Canada does not use number pooling as a relief measure. Instead, each competitive local exchange carrier is allocated blocks of 10,000 numbers (corresponding to a single prefix) in each rate centre in which it plans to offer service, even in the smallest hamlets. Once a prefix is assigned to a carrier and rate centre, it cannot be moved elsewhere even if a rate centre has more than enough numbers to serve its customers. That has resulted in thousands of wasted numbers, a problem that has been exacerbated by the proliferation of fax machines and pagers and then of cell phones.

By the middle of the first decade of the 2000s, 250 was already on the verge of exhaustion, again because of the number allocation problem and the continued proliferation of cell phones, particularly on Vancouver Island and in the larger cities of the interior. Amid projections that 250 would be exhausted by January 2008, the Canadian Radio-Television and Telecommunications Commission began considering relief options in early 2007. Proposals included: 

 a geographic split that would have left 250 with the interior and switched Vancouver Island to a new area code
 expanding area code 778, previously a concentrated overlay for Metro Vancouver and the Fraser Valley, to the 250 territory
 concentrated overlays covering part of the 250 territory

Several of the major landline and wireless providers in the 250 territory strongly favoured an overlay and stated that it would be easier to implement than a split. They also wanted to spare themselves and their customers the expense and burden of changing their numbers, which would have required a massive reprogramming of cell phones. The proposal for a split would have forced Vancouver Island's residents to change their numbers for a second time in a decade.

The CRTC announced on June 7, 2007 that 778 would be expanded to become an overlay for the entire province starting that July 4. On that date, exchanges in 778 became available to Vancouver Island and interior residents, and a permissive dialling period began across British Columbia during which it was possible to make local calls with either seven or ten digits. Three CO prefixes in the 250 area code were reserved for use by Northwestel, as 13 of its 15 switches could not then handle multiple area codes, and its system could not accommodate ten-digit-dialling.

The CRTC decided on an overlay after concluding that there was not enough time to implement a split before 250 was due to exhaust in January 2008. Effective June 23, 2008, ten-digit dialling became mandatory throughout the entire province, and attempts to make a seven-digit call triggered an intercept message with a reminder of the new rule. After September 12, 2008, seven-digit dialling no longer functioned. Overlays have become the preferred method of area code relief in Canada, as they are an easy workaround for the number allocation problem, as opposed to a split plan.

On June 1, 2013, area code 236 was implemented as a distributed overlay of area codes 250, 604, and 778 and was expected to be exhausted by May 2020. As a result, area code 672 was implemented on May 4, 2019, as an additional distributed overlay to relieve area codes 250, 604, 778, and 236.

Service area and central office codes
100 Mile House: 395 456 593 396 706
 Armstrong: 546
 Beaverdell: 484
 Bella Bella: 957
 Bridge River Valley, including Bralorne, Brexton, Gold Bridge, and Gun Lake: 238
 Campbell River: 201 202 203 204 205 286 287 346 504 830 850 895 923 
 Castlegar: 304 365 608 687
 Chetwynd: 788
 Christina Lake: 447
 Cranbrook: 417 420 421 426 450 464 489 581 919
 Creston: 254 402 428 431 435 977
 Comox: 339 890 941
 Courtenay: 207 218 331 334 338 465 585 650 702 703 792 871 897 898
 The Cowichan Valley comprises the following local rate centres:
 Chemainus: 210 246 324 416 436 533 606
 Cobble Hill: 733 743 929
 Duncan: 252 466 510 597 701 709 710 715 732 737 746 748 815 856 
 Ladysmith: 245 912 924
 Lake Cowichan: 749 932
 Youbou: 745
 Cumberland: 336
 Dawson Creek: 219 467 719 782 784 795 806 854 
 Elkford: 865
 Enderby: 838
 Fernie: 278 430 946
 Fort Nelson: 774
 Fort St. James: 996
 Fort St. John: 224 261 262 263 264 271 329 663 785 787 793 794 
 Gold River: 283
 Golden: 344 439 272
 Grand Forks: 442 443 584 666
 Greenwood: 445
 Gulf Islands, including Galiano Island, Mayne Island, and Saturna Island: 222 539
 Hazelton: 842
 Hixon: 998
 Houston: 845
 Hudson's Hope: 783 903
 Hyder, Alaska: 234 636
 Invermere: 270 341 342 409 688
 Kamloops: 214 299 312 314 318 319 320 371 372 374 376 377 434 461 554 571 572 573 574 576 578 579 682 705 819 828 851 852 879
 Surrounding communities:
 Chase: 679
 Barriere: 672
 Clearwater: 674
 Cache Creek: 313 457
 Logan Lake: 523
 Savona: 373
 Kaslo: 353 943
 Kelowna: 212 215 258 300 317 322 448 450 451 452 454 469 470 491 575 681 712 717 718 762 763 764 765 769 801 807 808 826 859 860 861 862 863 864 868 869 870 872 878 899 979 980
 Surrounding communities:
 Oyama: 548
 Peachland: 767
 West Kelowna:  700 707 768
 Winfield: 766
 Kimberley: 427 432 520 602 908 
 Kitimat: 632 639
 Kitwanga: 849
 Rural Kootenays: 229 357 399 424 429 529 603 829
 Lillooet: 256
 Lytton: 455
 Mackenzie: 997
 Merritt: 280 315 378 525 936
 Midway: 449 528 605
 Nakusp: 265
 Nanaimo is divided into the following local rate centres:
 Cedar: 323 722
 Lantzville: 390 933
 Nanaimo: 244 255 268 327 518 585 591 616 618 619 667 668 713 714 716 734 739 740 741 753 754 755 762 796 797 802 816 824
 Wellington: 729 751 756 758 760 
 Nanoose Bay: 468
 Nelson: 352 354 505 509 551 777 825
 Oliver: 485 498
 Osoyoos: 495
 Parksville: 228 240 248 586 607 905 927 937 947 951 954 
 Pender Island: 629
 Penticton: 274 276 328 460 462 482 486 487 488 490 492 493 770 809 817
 Port Alberni: 206 419 720 723 724 730 731 735 736 913 918
 Port Hardy: 230 902 949 
 Port McNeill: 956
 Prince George: 277 301 552 561 562 563 564 565 596 612 613 614 617 640 645 649 906 960 961 962 963 964 970 981
 Prince Rupert: 624 627
 Qualicum Beach: 752
 Quesnel: 255 316 925 983 985 991 992 747 249
 Revelstoke: 814 837
 Rossland: 362
 Saanich: 544 654 655 657 665 669
 Salmon Arm: 489 515 803 804 832 833
 Salt Spring Island: 537 538 653
 Sidney: 652 656
 Slocan Valley: 355 358 359 226
 Smithers: 847 877 917
 Sooke: 642 664 867
 Jordan River: 646
 Port Renfrew: 647
 Sparwood: 425 910
 Stewart: 636
 Summerland: 404 494
 Terrace: 615 631 635 638 641 892 922 975
 Tofino: 522 725 
 Trail: 231 364 368 512 521 693 921
 Fruitvale: 367
 Tumbler Ridge: 242
 Ucluelet: 266 726
 Union Bay, including Fanny Bay, Denman Island, and Hornby Island: 335
 Valemount: 566
 Vanderhoof,: 524 567 570 944
 Vernon: 241 260 275 306 307 308 309 351 503 540 541 542 543 545 549 550 558 907 938
 Victoria: 208 213 216 217 220 294 298 310 356 360 361 363 370 380 381 382 383 384 385 386 387 388 389 391 405 410 412 413 414 415 418 419 472 474 475 477 478 479 480 483 507 508 514 516 519 532 536 580 588 589 590 592 595 598 634 658 661 686 704 708 721 727 744 800 812 813 818 823 853 857 858 880 881 882 883 884 885 886 888 889 891 893 896 915 920 940 952 953 978 984 995 999
 Wells: 994
 Williams Lake: 267 302 303 305 392 398 855
 Wynndel: 866
 Zeballos: 761

See also

Area code 604
Area codes 778, 236, and 672
List of NANP area codes

References

Bibliography

External links
 CNA exchange list for area +1-250
 CNA NPA 250 Relief Planning
 Telecom archives
 Area Code Map of Canada
 Area Code 250 with NXX 310 is not a valid NXX

Telecommunications-related introductions in 1996
250
250
Communications in British Columbia